This list is of the Natural Monuments of Japan within the Circuit of Hokkaidō.

National Natural Monuments
As of 1 October 2016, forty-seven Natural Monuments have been designated, including six *Special Natural Monuments.

Prefectural Natural Monuments
As of 21 September 2016, thirty-three Natural Monuments have been designated at a prefectural level.

Municipal Natural Monuments
As of 1 May 2016, one hundred and twenty-nine Natural Monuments have been designated at a municipal level.

See also
 Cultural Properties of Japan
 List of parks and gardens of Hokkaido
 List of Places of Scenic Beauty of Japan (Hokkaido)
 List of Natural Monuments of Japan (Okinawa)

References

External links
  Cultural Properties in Hokkaido

 Hokkaido
Hokkaido